Frankie and Johnny is a 1966 American Western musical film starring Elvis Presley as a riverboat gambler. The role of "Frankie" was played by Donna Douglas from The Beverly Hillbillies TV series. The film reached #40 on the Variety weekly national box office list for 1966. The budget of the film was estimated at $4.5 million. The director was Frederick De Cordova, who in 1970 went on to become the director and producer of The Tonight Show Starring Johnny Carson.

Plot
Johnny and girlfriend Frankie are performers on a Mississippi River riverboat, which also has a casino. Johnny is a compulsive gambler who is down on his luck and in debt. Johnny and his friend Cully, a musician and composer, visit a gypsy camp to get his fortune told. A lady reads tea leaves and tells Johnny that he will soon meet a red-haired woman who will bring him luck.

Back on the boat, Johnny and Cully promptly encounter Nellie Bly, their boss Clint Braden's on-again, off-again girlfriend. Nellie has just caught Braden seducing another singer, Mitzi. Since she has red hair, Nellie is persuaded by Johnny to touch his chips for luck. After he wins, Johnny is convinced that the gypsy must be correct. Frankie finds out and becomes jealous, as does Johnny's boss.

In a bit of musical theatre, Frankie shoots Johnny for dancing with Nellie Bly while singing Cully's latest song. A Broadway recruiter sees the riverboat show and buys the rights to this new song, suggesting that Frankie and Johnny should work together with him in New York City. Landing in New Orleans, the musical cast and riverboat crew attend a masked ball. Frankie, Nellie and Mitzi all rent the same Madame Pompadour costume.

Johnny is eager for the luck of redhead Nellie to win more money, contrary to Frankie's expressed wishes. Being masked and in costume, Frankie and Nellie scheme to switch places to test Johnny's lucky-redhead theory. Johnny wins $10,000 at roulette, but when he kisses the woman he believes to be Nellie, he discovers the switch. Frankie is furious and throws all the winnings out of a window, into the street.

Blackie, a dim-witted stooge who works for the boss, hears Braden drunkenly complain about how he has lost Nellie. Thinking he can be of help, Blackie switches the blank cartridge in Frankie's stage gun for a real bullet.

The boss tries to prevent the impending disaster, but arrives on stage too late and Johnny is shot for real. Frankie forgives his gambling as the love of her life appears to be dying, but he stands up, apparently unhurt. Johnny was saved because the bullet struck a lucky medallion he was wearing that Frankie had given him.

Primary cast
Elvis Presley as  Johnny
Donna Douglas as  Frankie
Harry Morgan as Cully
Sue Ane Langdon as Mitzi
Nancy Kovack as Nellie Bly
Audrey Christie as Peg
Anthony Eisley as Clint Braden
Robert Strauss as Blackie
Joyce Jameson as Abigail
Naomi Stevens as Princess Zolita (uncredited)
Dave Willock as the bartender (uncredited)

Production
Filming started in May 1965 and took place in Hollywood and New Orleans. Under his contract with United Artists, Presley was paid $700,000 plus 50% of the profits.

Reception
Howard Thompson of The New York Times reported that the film opened with a "dull thud" and "sheds feathers almost from the start" stating that Presley's formula never before "seemed so feeble and so obvious."

Variety wrote that the film "hits the mark as pleasant entertainment, and is certain to be another Presley money-winner."

Kevin Thomas of the Los Angeles Times felt that despite "generally mediocre production values" particularly lacking in good dance numbers, the film was "fast-moving fun" and a good vehicle for Presley.

The Monthly Film Bulletin wrote: "After a long series of lifeless flops, Elvis Presley is here right back on form; or at least the film round him is (Elvis himself rarely changes) ... Although the story tends to sag a little during the romantic complications, the script is pleasantly witty, with Henry Morgan and the enchanting Nancy Kovack outstanding."

Soundtrack

References

External links
 
 
 Frankie and Johnny – Sergent.com.au

1960s Western (genre) musical films
1966 films
1966 musical comedy films
American musical comedy films
American Western (genre) comedy films
American Western (genre) musical films
Fictional couples
Films directed by Frederick de Cordova
Films produced by Edward Small
Films set in New Orleans
Films shot in Los Angeles
Films shot in New Orleans
United Artists films
1960s English-language films
1960s American films